Phindavele High School is a public school located in Dududu, south coast of KwaZulu Natal. It opened in 1978. The school enrols about 1000 pupils. The school falls under quantile 3. It has no Internet access, library or laboratories.

References 

Schools in KwaZulu-Natal
Educational institutions established in 1978